Stichopogon argenteus is a species of robber flies, insects in the family Asilidae.

References

Asilidae
Articles created by Qbugbot
Insects described in 1823